Jameeh Bozorg (also Romanized as Jāme‘eh-ye Bozorg; also known as  Jāmeh Bozorg and Jāme‘-ye Bozorg) is a village in Koshksaray Rural District, in the Central District of Marand County, East Azerbaijan Province, Iran. At the 2006 census, its population was 819, in 200 families.

References 

Populated places in Marand County